Lethata buscki is a moth in the family Depressariidae. It was described by W. Donald Duckworth in 1964. It is found in Belize, Honduras and Mexico.

The forewings are deep ochreous with the costa rose. There is a spot at the end of the cell, composed of a ring of fuscous surrounding white scales. The hindwings are light ochreous slightly overcast with grey scales.

References

Moths described in 1964
Lethata